Souk El Azzafine is one of the souks of the medina of Tunis and where the musicians used to meet.

Etymology 

It got its name from the Arabic word azzafa that means « music playing ».

Monument 

Bimaristan Al Azzafine, which is a hospital that was built during the reign of Hammuda Pasha in 1662, is located in this Souk.

Notes and references 

Azzafine